Sena may refer to:

Places
 Sanandaj or Sena, city in northwestern Iran
 Sena (state constituency), represented in the Perlis State Legislative Assembly
 Sena, Dashtestan, village in Bushehr Province, Iran
 Sena, Huesca, municipality in Huesca province, Spain
 Sena, Iran, village in Bushehr Province, Iran
 Sena, a Medieval Catalan exonym for Siena, Italy
 Sena, Yemen
 Seňa, village and municipality in the Kosice Region, Slovakia
 Vila de Sena or Sena, Mozambique

People
Balthasar Seña (1590–1614), Spanish Jesuit missionary
 Dominic Sena (born 1949), American movie director
 Suzanne Sena (born 1963), American television host
 Maryam Sena, wife of Sarsa Dengel, the Emperor of Ethiopia
Lady Tsukiyama also known as Sena (瀬名), Japanese samurai-class woman.
 , Japanese snowboarder (born 1999)

Fictional characters
 Robin Sena from Witch Hunter Robin
 Sena Kobayakawa from Eyeshield 21
 Sena Hayami from Mashin Sentai Kiramager
 Kaito Sena from Torture Princess: Fremd Torturchen
 Sena from Xenoblade Chronicles 3

Films & television

 Sena (film), Tamil-language crime film (2003)

Other uses
 Sena (company), in Iceland
 Sena (wine), of Chile
 Sena dynasty, dynasty that ruled Bengal in the 11th and 12th centuries
 Sena language, language in central Mozambique
 Sena people, ethnic group of Mozambique and Malawi
  or National Service of Learning, public institution of education in Colombia 
 Sena (moth), a moth genus in the subfamily Lasiocampinae

See also
 Amphoe Sena, district in Ayutthaya Province, Thailand
 Bangladesh Senabahini, the native name of the Bangladeshi Army
 Bharatiya Sena, the native name of the Indian Army
 Nepali Sena, the native name of the Nepalese Army
 Saena, city in Tuscany, Italy
 Sena de Luna, municipality in León province, Spain
 Senigallia, formerly Sena Gallica, Ancona, Italy
 Senna (disambiguation)
 Shanti Sena or Peace army, made up of Gandhi's followers in India
 Shiv Sena, political party in India

Language and nationality disambiguation pages